Charles "Buzz" Guarnera (March 23, 1930 – February 1, 2004) was an American trumpet and flugelhorn player.

Early life and education
Born March 23, 1930 in Cleveland, Ohio, Guarnera started playing music at a very young age. He was influenced into Big Band and jazz music. At the age of 16, Guarnera started his music career touring with Midwest and Jack Wilson. By then moved to New York City, study at Mannes School of Music. By 1951 he served in the military being based in Trieste, Italy. He played in a military band with which included flautist Herbie Mann. Along the way he shared a room with Don Preston who later played with him in Frank Zappa and The Mothers of Invention. In 1953 Guarnera called it quits and left the military service, and moved to Paris, France. While in Paris he played with René Thomas and André Hodeir, recording a couple of albums with them. In 1955 Gardner moved back to New York to study at the Manhattan School of Music.  By 1959 he graduated from Manhattan School of Music with a BA degree in music. After graduating from Manhattan School of Music, he moved to Los Angeles and played with his brother Bunk. The brothers played in Latin and jazz groups together.

Career
In 1962 Buzz met up with Don Preston again, playing in Don Preston's Unnamed Experimental Project.  By 1968, Buzz changed his style of genre playing in avant-garde/jazz fusion music background. In November 1968 Buzz joined Frank Zappa's band the Mothers of Invention playing the trumpet, also reuniting with his brother Bunk. Buzz only appeared in two of the Mothers of Invention's albums, Burnt Weeny Sandwich and Weasels Ripped My Flesh. In August 1969, Zappa disbanded the Mothers. Buzz and Bunk went to play with John Balkin, performing as Menage A Trois from 1969 to 1972.

The brothers appeared on Tim Buckley's 1970 Starsailor and Domenic Troiano's 1972 self-titled debut album. In 1980, Buzz reunited with some of the Mothers of Invention group members, with Bunk, Jimmy Carl Black, Jim Sherwood, and Don Preston. The group was called the Grandmothers. The group recorded a few albums and reunited in 2002.

Buzz died on February 1, 2004, at the age of 72. He was survived by his brother Bunk Gardner.

Discography

René Thomas quintet: rené thomas et son quintette 1954
Bobby Jaspar: bobby jaspar's new jazz vol.2 1954
Andre Hodeir et le jazz groupe de paris: essais 1955

With Frank Zappa and the Mothers of Invention 

    Uncle Meat (1969) 
    Burnt Weeny Sandwich (1970)
    Weasels Ripped My Flesh (1970)
    You Can't Do That On Stage Anymore Sampler (1988)
    You Can't Do That On Stage Anymore Vol. 1 (1988)
    You Can't Do That On Stage Anymore Vol. 4 (1991)
    You Can't Do That On Stage Anymore Vol. 5 (1992)
    BTB I: The Ark (1991)
    BTB II: Our Man In Nirvana (1992)

With Captain Beefheart & his Magic Band
 Trout Mask Replica (1969)

Geronimo Black 
Geronimo Black (1972)

Tim Buckley
Starsailor (1970)

Domenic Troiano
Domenic Troiano (1972)

with Grandmothers

The Grandmothers (1981)
Fan Club Talk (1981)
Lookin Up Granny's Dress (1983)
A Mother of Anthology (1993)

with Ant-Bee

Electronic Church Muzik (2011)

References
United Mutations

Notes

1931 births
2004 deaths
Musicians from Cleveland
American trumpeters
American male trumpeters
The Mothers of Invention members
20th-century American male musicians